Gorgi-ye Manderek (also Romanized as Gorgī-ye Manderek; also known as Gorgeh'ī, Gorgeh-ye Manderek, Gorgey, Gorgī, Gorgor Manderek, and Gurgai) is a village in Hasanabad Rural District, in the Central District of Eslamabad-e Gharb County, Kermanshah Province, Iran. At the 2006 census, its population was 637, in 126 families.

References 

Populated places in Eslamabad-e Gharb County